Frame rate control (FRC) is a method for achieving greater color depth in TFT LCD displays.

Older TN panels represented colors using only 6 bits per RGB color, or 18 bit in total, and were unable to display the 16.78 million color shades (24-bit truecolor) that display devices like graphics cards, video game consoles, tablet computers and set-top boxes can output. Instead, they could use a dithering method that combines adjacent pixels to simulate the desired shade. As of 2021, most TN panels are capable of displaying 24-bit color without any form of dithering.

FRC is a form of temporal dithering which cycles between different color shades with each new frame to simulate an intermediate shade. This can create a potentially noticeable 30 Hz (half frame rate) flicker. FRC tends to be most noticeable in darker tones, while dithering appears to make the individual pixels of the LCD visible. TFT panels available in 2020 often used FRC to display 30-bit deep color or HDR10 with 24-bit color panels.

This method is similar in principle to field-sequential color system by CBS and other sequential color methods such as used in Digital Light Processing (DLP).

In the demonstration video green and cyan-green are mixed both statically (for reference) and by rapidly alternating. A display with a refresh rate of at least 60hz is recommended for this video. Pausing the video shows that the perceived color of the bottom-right square during playback is different from the color seen in any individual frame. In an LCD display that uses FRC the colors that are alternated between would be more similar than those in the demonstration video, further reducing the flicker effect.

See also
 Computer monitor
 LCD television

References

Display technology